The term political statement is used to refer to any act or non-verbal form of communication that is intended to influence a decision to be made for or by a political party

A political statement can vary from a mass demonstration to the wearing of a badge with a political slogan. It was a term popularised in the 1960s but still has some currency.

The term has also been used to describe negotiated statements such as the Seville Statement on Violence or the Waldorf Statement, or extempore utterances with political implications